The women's 4x400 metres relay event at the 2010 World Junior Championships in Athletics was held in Moncton, New Brunswick, Canada, at Moncton Stadium on 24 and 25 July.

Medalists

Results

Final
25 July

Heats
24 July

Heat 1

Heat 2

Participation
According to an unofficial count, 68 athletes from 15 countries participated in the event.

References

4 x 400 metres relay
Relays at the World Athletics U20 Championships
2010 in women's athletics